Lake Park is a village in Union County, North Carolina, United States. The population was 3,422 at the 2010 census.

Geography

Several lakes can clearly be seen when inside city limits, as well as from satellite view.

Demographics

As of the census of 2000, there were 2,093 people, 750 households, and 609 families residing in the village. The population density was 2,630.1 people per square mile (1,010.1/km2). There were 781 housing units at an average density of 981.4 per square mile (376.9/km2). The racial makeup of the city was 90.83% White, 5.16% African American, 0.53% Native American, 1.39% Asian, 0.14% Pacific Islander, 0.43% from other races, and 1.53% from two or more races. Hispanic or Latino of any race were 2.48% of the population.

There were 750 households, out of which 45.1% had children under the age of 18 living with them, 73.3% were married couples living together, 6.8% had a female householder with no husband present, and 18.7% were non-families. 14.9% of all households were made up of individuals, and 3.5% had someone living alone who was 65 years of age or older. The average household size was 2.79 and the average family size was 3.13.

In the city the population was spread out, with 30.9% under the age of 18, 4.3% from 18 to 24, 41.9% from 25 to 44, 17.1% from 45 to 64, and 5.8% who were 65 years of age or older. The median age was 33 years. For every 100 females, there were 93.3 males. For every 100 females age 18 and over, there were 90.1 males.

The median income for a household in the village was $68,304, and the median income for a family was $71,630. Males had a median income of $47,083 versus $31,848 for females. The per capita income for the village was $25,330. About 1.7% of families and 2.0% of the population were below the poverty line, including 1.8% of those under age 18 and 4.4% of those age 65 or over.

References

External links
 Official website of the Village of Lake Park, NC
 Official website of the Lake Park Homeowners Association

Villages in Union County, North Carolina
Villages in North Carolina